Pierceland (Turchyn Field) Aerodrome  is located  west-southwest of Pierceland, Saskatchewan, Canada.

See also 
 List of airports in Saskatchewan

References 

Registered aerodromes in Saskatchewan